An agglomeration community is a government structure in France, created by the Chevènement Law of 1999. It is one of four forms of intercommunality, less integrated than a métropole or a communauté urbaine but more integrated than a communauté de communes. Agglomeration communities consist of a commune of at least 15,000 inhabitants (or a prefecture with less than 15,000 inhabitants) and its independent suburbs.

As of March 2020, there are 222 agglomeration communities in France (207 in metropolitan France and 15 in the overseas departments). The population (as of 2017) of the agglomeration communities ranges from 355,650 inhabitants (CA Grand Paris Sud Seine-Essonne-Sénart) to 29,289 inhabitants (CA Grand Verdun).

Several former communautés d'agglomération have been converted into communautés urbaines or métropoles, for instance those of Strasbourg, Rouen, Saint-Étienne and Caen.

List of communautés d'agglomération

The table below lists the communautés d'agglomération with more than 200,000 inhabitants (as of 2021).

References

External links 
 Association of intercommunalites

 
Fifth-level administrative divisions by country